Han Jung-Hwa (born 31 October 1982) is a South Korean football midfielder.

Jung-Hwa's previous clubs are FC Seoul, Gwangju Sangmu. In the 2009 season, he was loaned out to Daegu FC for one year. In July 2010, he joined Goyang Kookmin Bank FC after being released from Busan I'Park.

References

External links 

1982 births
Living people
South Korean footballers
FC Seoul players
Gimcheon Sangmu FC players
Busan IPark players
Daegu FC players
Goyang KB Kookmin Bank FC players
K League 1 players
Korea National League players
Association football midfielders